Kedoya Selatan (Indonesian for South Kedoya) is an administrative village in the Kebon Jeruk district, city of West Jakarta, Indonesia. It has postal code of 11520. 

Taman Kedoya Baru residential estate and Kedoya Elok Apartment are located in this area. Taman Kedoya Sport Club is a sport center in the residential estate. Facilities are tennis courts, swimming pools, and a fitness center.

The Jakarta–Tangerang Toll Road has eastbound exit ramp in Kedoya. This is the last exit ramp before the eastern terminus in Tomang, which also merges to Jakarta Inner Ring Road.

List of Important Places 
 MetroTV headquarter
 Jakarta Eye Center (JEC)
 Taman Kedoya Sport Club
 Polabugar Sport Center

See also 
 Kebon Jeruk
 List of administrative villages of Jakarta

References

http://www.idjakarta.com/barat/kebonjeruk/kedoyaselatan/kodepos11520.html

West Jakarta
Administrative villages in Jakarta